Bonab Rural District is in the Central District of Marand County, East Azerbaijan province, Iran. At the National Census of 2006, its population was 9,038 in 2,252 households. There were 10,395 inhabitants in 2,931 households at the following census of 2011. At the most recent census of 2016, the population of the rural district was 10,668 in 3,165 households. The largest of its 10 villages was Ordaklu, with 5,985 people.

References 

Marand County

Rural Districts of East Azerbaijan Province

Populated places in East Azerbaijan Province

Populated places in Marand County